Steve Smith (born 1954) is a recognized American professional pool player and pool hustler from Dallas, Texas. He is nicknamed "the Lizard".

References

Player profile at AZBilliards.com
Smith, Steven James (2012). Through the Eyes of the Lizard. San Marcos: iUniverse. 
Interview with the University Star

1954 births
American pool players
Living people
Date of birth missing (living people)
Place of birth missing (living people)
People from Dallas